The Ōhau River is in the Horowhenua District of New Zealand's North Island. It flows from the confluence of two short rivers, the North Ōhau River and the South Ōhau River. The Ōhau initially flows north, turning west to the southeast of Levin.

References

Rivers of Manawatū-Whanganui
Rivers of New Zealand